Komintern is the name of several rural localities in Russia:
Komintern, Republic of Adygea, a khutor in Maykopsky District of the Republic of Adygea
Komintern, Altai Krai, a settlement in Volchikhinsky District of Altai Krai
Komintern, the name of several other rural localities